Rugbyclub Oudsbergen is a Belgian rugby club in Opglabbeek. The club will be called Oudsbergen from 1 January 2019.

External links
 Rugbyclub Maasland

Belgian rugby union clubs